William Simonds may refer to:

William Simonds (author) (1822–1859), American author
William E. Simonds (1842–1903), United States Representative and Medal of Honor recipient
William Blackall Simonds (1761–1834), English brewer and banker
William Barrow Simonds (1820–1911), English politician, MP for Winchester
William Simonds (politician), MP for Windsor
William Adams Simonds (1887–1963), American author of biographies on Henry Ford and Thomas Edison

See also
William Symonds (disambiguation)